Fever tree is a common name for Vachellia xanthophloea, a tree native to eastern and southern Africa: also Kipling's fevertree

Fever tree may also refer to:

Other trees 

 Pinckneya pubens, a tree native to the southern United States
 Anthocleista grandiflora, commonly known as the forest fever tree 
 Cinchona, called fever tree in India. The bark of this species is used as a source of quinine

Other things 

 Fever Tree (band), a 1960s psychedelic rock band
 Fever Tree (album), the band's debut album
 Fever-Tree, a producer of drink mixers
 The Fever Tree, a collection of short stories by British author Ruth Rendell